Bence Szabó (born 16 January 1998) is a Hungarian football player who plays for Slovenian club Nafta 1903.

Club career
On 23 July 2017 he was signed by Nemzeti Bajnokság I club Videoton FC.

Club statistics

Updated to games played as of 21 June 2020.

Honours
Puskás Akadémia FC
 Nemzeti Bajnokság II: 2016–17

References 

 Vidi.hu Official Website
 
 

1998 births
Sportspeople from Székesfehérvár
Living people
Hungarian footballers
Hungary youth international footballers
Hungary under-21 international footballers
Association football midfielders
Puskás Akadémia FC II players
Puskás Akadémia FC players
Fehérvár FC players
Nyíregyháza Spartacus FC players
Diósgyőri VTK players
Debreceni VSC players
Zalaegerszegi TE players
NK Nafta Lendava players
Nemzeti Bajnokság I players
Nemzeti Bajnokság II players
Nemzeti Bajnokság III players
Slovenian Second League players
Hungarian expatriate footballers
Expatriate footballers in Slovenia
Hungarian expatriate sportspeople in Slovenia